Elliot Davis (born May 23, 1948) is an American cinematographer.

Davis graduated from Virginia Tech with a Bachelor of Arts in Architecture and a Master of Fine Arts in Film from UCLA. Davis feels his tenure as an architect carries over into his shooting style.

Davis began his career in the mid 1970s, acting as cinematographer on the drama Harvest: 3,000 Years. He also would act as the camera operator for various films, including Francis Ford Coppola's The Outsiders and Joel Schumacher's St. Elmo's Fire. Davis would collaborate frequently with several directors, including Steven Soderbergh (King of the Hill, The Underneath, Gray's Anatomy, Out of Sight),  Catherine Hardwicke (Thirteen, Lords of Dogtown, The Nativity Story, Twilight), and Jessie Nelson (I Am Sam, Love the Coopers).

Davis was the director of photography for Nate Parker's controversial directorial debut The Birth of a Nation. Davis was not familiar with Parker prior to receiving the script, but soon forged a creative connection with him, using films such as The Assassination of Jesse James by the Coward Robert Ford as influence for the look of Nation.

Additional works include The Cutting Edge, Father of the Bride Part II, Equinox, Larger Than Life, Forces of Nature, 40 Days and 40 Nights, White Oleander, Legally Blonde 2: Red, White & Blonde, A Love Song for Bobby Long, The Iron Lady, Man of Tai Chi and the upcoming Above Suspicion.

For his work on Equinox and The Underneath, Davis received two nominations for the Independent Spirit Award for Best Cinematography.

Filmography

References

External links 
Elliot Davis at the Internet Movie Database

1948 births
American architects
American cinematographers
Virginia Tech alumni
Living people
UCLA Film School alumni